Lauxania cylindricornis is a species of fly in the family Lauxaniidae. It is found in the Palearctic.

References

Lauxaniidae
Insects described in 1794
Muscomorph flies of Europe